Louis Boivin (1649–1724) was a French writer and the elder brother of Jean Boivin the Younger.

Life
A member of the Académie des inscriptions, he wrote Mémoires sur la Chronologie in which, according to the Dictionnaire Bouillet he jumped too easily to his derivations.

Sources

External links
 

1649 births
1724 deaths
17th-century French writers
17th-century French male writers
18th-century French writers
18th-century French male writers
Members of the Académie des Inscriptions et Belles-Lettres